Aaqib Javed (born 5 August 1972) is a Pakistani cricket coach and former cricketer. He was a right-handed fast-medium pace bowler with the ability to swing the ball both ways. He played 22 Tests and 163 One Day Internationals for Pakistan between 1988 and 1998. He was a part of the Pakistan team which won the 1992 Cricket World Cup.

He is currently serving as the director of cricket operations and head coach of Pakistan Super League side Lahore Qalandars.

Personal life 
Aaqib Javed was born into a Jat-Sandhu family in Sheikhupura.

He played cricket for the first time in Bhamba Kalan village near Raiwind. He completed his primary education in the Government High School in Bhamba Kalan. He then studied at Government Islamia College in Lahore.

He married Farzana Aqib, a novelist, poet, journalist and human rights activist, in 1998.

International career
Aaqib's best performances in internationals came against India. He took 54 wickets in his 39 ODIs against India at an average of 24.64 – 6.79 runs lower than his career ODI average. Four of his six ODI Man of the Match awards were against India.

Aaqib took a hat-trick in an ODI against India on 25 October 1991, aged only 19 years and 81 days. He remains the youngest player to have taken an ODI hat-trick. He was a key member of the Pakistan team that won the 1992 Cricket World Cup.

Coaching career
Previously, Aaqib was the chief coach of the National Cricket Academy in Lahore. He is also associated with The Computer House, a Pakistani computer hardware company. He coached Pakistan's U-19 team to victory in the 2004 U-19 Cricket World Cup. Aaqib has, in the past, also helped with the development of the Afghanistan national cricket team. He also served as the bowling coach of the Pakistan cricket team. With Waqar Younis the head coach and Intikhab Alam the manager, but on 10 February 2012 he resigned from being the bowling coach of Pakistan and shifted to becoming the bowling and head coach of the United Arab Emirates national cricket team, a position he held until 2016.

Since 2016, he has been the Director of Cricket Operations and bowling consultant for Lahore Qalandars in the Pakistan Super League. In December 2017, he was appointed as the head coach of the team.

References

External links
 

1972 births
Living people
Pakistan Test cricketers
Pakistan One Day International cricketers
One Day International hat-trick takers
Cricketers at the 1992 Cricket World Cup
Cricketers at the 1996 Cricket World Cup
Allied Bank Limited cricketers
Hampshire cricketers
Pakistan Automobiles Corporation cricketers
Islamabad cricketers
Pakistani cricket coaches
Pakistani cricketers
Cricketers from Sheikhupura
Lahore Division cricketers
Sheikhupura cricketers
Coaches of the United Arab Emirates national cricket team
Pakistan Super League coaches
Pakistani expatriate sportspeople in the United Arab Emirates
Government Islamia College alumni